Loose is the eighth studio album by the Japanese rock duo B'z, released on November 22, 1995. The album sold 1,336,150 copies in its first week, becoming the duo's highest debut for a duo album. In total over 3,003,210 copies were sold, making it the duo's highest selling studio album.

One of the album's standout tracks is a blues-flavored remake of "Bad Communication," as well as a more energetic version of the hit "Negai".

Track listing 
 Spirit Loose - 1:04
  - 3:32
 Negai("BUZZ!!" STYLE) (ねがい("BUZZ!!" STYLE)) - 5:01
 Yumemigaoka (夢見が丘) - 4:40
 Bad Communication (000-18) - 4:57
 Kienai Niji (消えない虹) - 3:37
 Love Me, I Love You (with G Bass) - 3:20
 Love Phantom - 4:40
 Teki ga Inakerya (敵がいなけりゃ) - 3:14
 Suna no Hanabira (砂の花びら) - 3:41
 Kirei na Ai jya Nakutemo (キレイな愛じゃなくても) - 4:04
 Big - 2:53
 Drive to My World - 4:09

Certifications

References 
 B'z albums at the official site

1995 albums
B'z albums
Japanese-language albums